Kevin Henderson may refer to:

 Kevin Henderson (footballer) (born 1974), English footballer 
 Kevin Henderson (ice hockey) (born 1986), Canadian ice hockey player 
 Kevin Henderson (rugby league) (born 1981), British rugby league footballer
 Kevin Henderson (basketball) (born 1964), American basketball player